The 1984 Nicholls State Colonels football team represented Nicholls State University as a member of the Gulf Star Conference during the 1984 NCAA Division I-AA football season. Nicholls State played home games at John L. Guidry Stadium in Thibodaux, Louisiana.

Schedule

References

Nicholls State
Nicholls Colonels football seasons
Nicholls State Colonels football